The Second Battle of Tarain''' was fought in 1192 between the Ghurid forces of Muhammad Ghuri and the Rajput Confederacy of Prithviraj Chauhan. The battle ended in a decisive victory for the invading Ghurids and their successful penetration in north Indian plain.

The battle is regarded as a watershed event in Medieval India history as it led to the destruction of Rajput powers for a while and laid the foundation of Muslim rule in North India, which led to the establishment of Delhi Sultanate.

Background 

Prithviraj Chauhan's forces had defeated the Ghurids at the First Battle of Tarain in 1191. The Ghurid king Mu'izz al-Din, who was seriously injured in the battle, returned to Ghazni, and made preparations to avenge his defeat.

Historians generally date the second battle of Tarain to 1192, although there is a possibility that it happened in late 1191.

Size of the forces

According to the 16th-17th century writer Firishta, the battle, "the Chauhan army consisted of 3,000 elephants, 300,000 cavalry and infantry", which is considered an exaggeration by modern historians. According to Satish Chandra the figures were exaggerated in order to "emphasise the challenge faced by Muizzuddin and the scale of his victory". Kaushik Roy similarly notes that Muslim chroniclers regularly exaggerated Hindu military strength to glorify the Muslim kings, and 300,000 was probably the theoretical number that could potentially be mobilized by all the Rajput kingdoms at the time.

According to Indian sources like Hammir Mahakavya and Prithviraj Raso, Chahamana army was simultaneously engaged on multiple fronts and Prithviraj had only a part of his army at the battlefield. His other army was about to reach Prithviraj but the fate was already decided in favour of Muizuddin.

According to Minhaj-i-Siraj, Mu'izz al-Din brought 120,000 fully armored men to battle, He personally commanded an elite cavalry force of 40,000 men. According to historian Kaushik Roy, while the real strength of the armies is not certain, it can be speculated that Prithviraj's army was numerically superior.

Battle

The battle occurred in the same field as the first one. Knowing the Chahamana forces were well-disciplined, the Ghurids did not want to engage in melee combat with them. Instead the Ghurids army was formed into five units, and four units were sent to attack the enemy flanks and rear.

According to Minhaj, Mu'izz ad-Din directed a light cavalry force of 10,000 mounted archers, divided into four divisions, to surround the Chahamana forces on the four sides. He instructed these soldiers not to engage in combat when the enemy advanced to attack, and instead feign retreat in order to exhaust the Chahamana elephants, horses, and infantry.

In hopes of causing a break in the enemy lines, Mu'izz al-Din ordered his fifth unit to feign retreat. The Chahamana forces charged the fleeing Ghurid unit, as the Ghurids expected. The Ghurids then sent a fresh cavalry unit of 12,000 and they managed to throw back the enemy advance. The remaining Ghurid forces then attacked and the Chahamana troops fled in panic. According to Minhaj, Mu'izz ad-Din's strategy "exhausted and wearied the unbelievers", ultimately resulting in a "victory to Islam".

Aftermath 

Minhaj states that Prithviraj ("Rae Pithora") dismounted from his elephant, and fled from the battlefield on a horse. He was, however, captured in the neighbourhood of Sursuti, and later "dispatched to hell". Most medieval sources state that Prithviraj was taken to the Chahamana capital Ajmer, where Muhammad planned to reinstate him as a Ghurid vassal. Sometime later, Prithviraj rebelled against Muhammad, and was killed for 'treason'.

The Ghurid forces subjugated the entire Chahamana territory of "Siwalikh" (or Sawalakh, that is, Sapadalaksha). The Ghurids then appointed his son Govindaraja IV on the throne of Ajmer as their vassal. Prithviraj's younger brother Hariraja dethroned Govindaraja, and recaptured a part of his ancestral kingdom, but was later defeated by the Ghurid general Qutb al-Din Aibak. The Ghurids subsequently defeated another powerful king - Jayachandra of Gahadavala dynasty - at the Battle of Chandawar, and conquered parts of northern India as far as Bengal.

See also
 Battles fought in Rajasthan

Notes

References

Bibliography 

 
 
 
 
 
 
 
 
 

Islamic rule in the Indian subcontinent
Tarain 1191
12th century in India
Battles involving the Ghurids
Tarain
Conflicts in 1191
Conflicts in 1192
1191 in Asia
1192 in Asia
Karnal district